
Wallington may refer to:

Places

Australia
 Wallington, Victoria

United Kingdom
 Wallington, Hampshire
 Wallington, Hertfordshire
 Wallington, London, a town in the London Borough of Sutton
 Wallington, Northumberland, a National Trust restored country manor in North East England.
 Wallingtons, a manor house in Kintbury, Berkshire, now the St Cassian's Centre
 River Wallington, Hampshire

United States
 Wallington, New Jersey
 Wallington, New York

People
 Wallington (surname)

See also
 Wallington Hall, a country house in Northumberland, England
 Wallington High School
 Wallington High School for Girls